The American Crystallographic Association, Inc. (ACA) is a non-profit, scientific organization for scientists who study the structure of matter via crystallographic methodologies. Since its founding in 1949 it has amassed over 2000 members worldwide.

The association meets annually in July and has several interest groups dealing with specific aspects of crystallography, including
fiber diffraction, neutron scattering and powder diffraction.

A quarterly magazine, called ACA RefleXions, is published in addition to a scholarly journal. Structural Dynamics is a peer-reviewed, open access, online-only journal co-published by ACA and AIP Publishing. It highlights research articles on structural determination and dynamics of systems, enabled by the emerging new instruments (e.g. XFELs, high harmonic generation, ultra-short electron sources, etc.) and new experimental and theoretical methodologies. The journal is accepting short communications, topical reviews, and research papers in the following topics: Experimental Methodologies, Theory and Modeling, Surfaces and Interfaces, Materials, Liquids and Solutions, and Biological Systems.

The association presents several awards

Past presidents
Past presidents of the association include:

Isidor Fankuchen (1950)
Ralph Walter Graystone Wyckoff (1951)
Paul Peter Ewald (1952)
William Lipscomb (1955)
Elizabeth A. Wood (1957)
Robert E. Rundle (1958)
Henri A. Levy (1965)
Jerome Karle (1972)
Philip Coppens (1978)
Jenny Glusker (1979)
David Sayre (1983)
William L. Duax (1986)
Helen M. Berman (1988)
Thomas Koetzle (2011)
George N. Phillips, Jr. (2012)
Cheryl Stevens (2013)
Martha Teeter (2014)
Christopher Cahill (2015)
Thomas Terwilliger (2016)
Amy Sarjeant (2017)
Lisa Keefe (2018)
Joseph D. Ferrara (2019)
Brian Toby (2020)
David Rose (2021)
Diana Tomchick (2022)

See also
 British Crystallographic Association
 German Crystallographic Society

References

External links
 American Crystallographic Association website

Crystallography organizations
Scientific organizations established in 1949
1949 establishments in the United States
Academic organizations based in the United States
Chemistry societies
Physics societies
Organizations based in Buffalo, New York